was a Japanese politician and comedian.

Born Isamu Yamada (山田勇 Yamada Isamu) in Kobe, he adopted his current stage name while directing the Manga Trio manzai troupe from 1959 to 1968. Following his comedy years, he went into the construction industry and served as a director at several major construction firms in the Kansai region.

He became governor of Osaka prefecture in 1995, running as an independent and joining the Liberal Democratic Party (LDP) after his election. He enjoyed great popularity as governor, mostly due to his existing fame as a comedian.

In 2000, a 21-year-old campaign volunteer accused Yokoyama of sexual harassment, claiming that the governor groped her for 30 minutes in the back of a campaign truck. Yokoyama denied the charges, but the Osaka District Court found him liable for ¥11 million in damages, following a highly publicized trial in which the plaintiff testified from behind an opaque screen to avoid revealing her identity. Following the judgment, Yokoyama resigned: he was replaced by a female LDP bureaucrat, Fusae Ohta.

External links
Official website (in Japanese)

1932 births
2007 deaths
Japanese comedians
Governors of Osaka
People from Kobe
Liberal Democratic Party (Japan) politicians
20th-century comedians
Japanese actor-politicians